Carlos Óscar Morales Vázquez (born 27 October 1957) is a Mexican politician affiliated with the Party of the Democratic Revolution. As of 2014 he served as Deputy of the LVII and LX Legislatures of the Mexican Congress representing Chiapas.

See also
 List of municipal presidents of Tuxtla Gutiérrez

References

1957 births
Living people
People from Chiapas
Party of the Democratic Revolution politicians
21st-century Mexican politicians
Deputies of the LX Legislature of Mexico
Members of the Chamber of Deputies (Mexico) for Chiapas